Harold or Harald Winkler may refer to:

Harold Winkler of End Conscription Campaign
Hal Winkler, Harold Winkler, ice hockey
Harald Winkler

See also
Harry Winkler (disambiguation)